Dash Kasan (also Romanized as Dāsh Kasan) is a village in Charuymaq-e Jonubegharbi Rural District, in the Central District of Charuymaq County, East Azerbaijan Province, Iran. At the 2006 census, its population was 37, in 7 families.

References 

Populated places in Charuymaq County